Dodoli Kidima or simply Dodoli (sometimes spelled Dodoly) is a Congo DR soukous guitarist. He is best known for his high speed solos, for which he has been nicknamed la machine a coudre ("the sewing machine").

He began his career in Orchestre Stukas, a soukous band that reached the apex of its popularity in Zaire in the mid-1970s. In the 1980s he played the lead guitar briefly in Bipoli Tshando's short-lived band Victoria Principal but reached the apex of his popularity in Bozi Boziana's Anti-Choc, one of the bands the dominated the soukous scene in that decade. Dodoly was so fundamental to Anti-Choc's sound that, when he left, the musicians that replaced him (including major guitarists such as Rigo Star) all sought to imitate his style. Dodoli left Anti-Choc briefly in 1987, to join Djo Nolo's short-lived project Choc Musica, but rejoined Boziana's band in 1988. That year, he was nominated "best guitarist" by the Kinshasa press. In Anti-Choc, he also contributed as a composer, writing hit songs such as Lelo Makambo – Lobi Makambo ("problems today, problems tomorrow"). He left Anti-Choc again in the early 1990s.

Partial discography

With Bozi Boziana and Anti-Choc
 Le Grand Père Bozi-Boziana & L'Anti-Choc – Ba Bokilo
 Bozi Boziana, Joly Detta and Deesse & L'Anti-Choc – Zongela Ngai
 Bozi Boziana & L'Anti-Choc – Coupe Monte
 Bozi Boziana – Ma Raison d'Être
 Anti-Choc – Adieu l'Ami (1988)

With others
 Safro Manzangi Elima – Wiseman

References

Sources
 Marty Sinnock, Bozi Boziana: Zaiko to Anti-Choc with a String of Beautiful Women, Africa Sounds
 Marty Sinnock (2), London, Paris, Kin, Brazza – Everybody Talk'about! King Kester Emeneya & Victoria Eleison, Africa Sounds
 Gary Stewart, Rumba on the River: A History of the Popular Music of the Two Congos'', Verso, London 2000

External links
Motou Dodoly Biography

Democratic Republic of the Congo guitarists
Living people
Year of birth missing (living people)
21st-century Democratic Republic of the Congo people